Rosemarie Myrdal (born May 20, 1929) is a North Dakota Republican Party politician who served as the second female, and 35th Lieutenant Governor of North Dakota from 1993 to 2001 under Governor of North Dakota Ed Schafer in 1992. She also served in the North Dakota House of Representatives from 1985 to 1992. Myrdal is widowed, and has five children.

See also
List of female lieutenant governors in the United States

Notes

Lieutenant Governors of North Dakota
1929 births
Living people
2000 United States presidential electors
Republican Party members of the North Dakota House of Representatives
Women state legislators in North Dakota
People from Minot, North Dakota
20th-century American women politicians
20th-century American politicians
21st-century American women politicians